is a 1938 Japanese war film directed by Tomotaka Tasaka. It won best film at the 1939 Kinema Junpo Awards and was nominated best film at the 1938 Venice International Film Festival.

Cast
 Hikaru Hoshi
 Ichirō Izawa ... Pvt. Koguchi
 Shirō Izome ... Cpl. Nakamura
 Isamu Kosugi ... Platoon Leader

External links
 
 
 

1938 films
Nikkatsu films
Japanese war films
Best Film Kinema Junpo Award winners
1938 war films
Japanese black-and-white films
1930s Japanese-language films